Ben Chasny is an American indie rock and psychedelic folk guitarist. His primary projects are Six Organs of Admittance (his solo psych folk project) and Comets on Fire (a psychedelic rock band).

Biography
Chasny made his recording debut in 1996 with his heavy, free rock project Plague Lounge on The Wicker Image, an LP released conjointly between the New World of Sound and Holy Mountain labels. Holy Mountain went on to become the "home" of many of his releases under the Six Organs of Admittance moniker. He has also released an album with Hiroyuki Usui under the name August Born. 

Chasny has lent his talents to other projects such as Badgerlore, Double Leopards, Current 93, Magik Markers, and a duo with Dredd Foole, both in live performance and studio albums. More recent musical projects of his include the avant-folk trio Rangda (along with guitarist Richard Bishop and drummer Chris Corsano) and the more melodic and conventional 200 Years with Magik Markers' Elisa Ambrogio.

Discography
 The Wicker Image (1996, New World of Sound/ Holy Mountain)

References

External links 

 Homecoming King - An Interview with Ben Chasny
 Set of Six Organs of Admittance at scheduletwo.com

American rock guitarists
American folk musicians
American folk guitarists
American male guitarists
Psychedelic folk musicians
Year of birth missing (living people)
Living people
Drag City (record label) artists